The Audi Snook is the name given to a concept for a single-wheeled vehicle (one large wheel countered with 3 counter-wheels) that is stabilized electronically. It was originally designed by Tilmann Schlootz, a German who won the Michelin Design Award 2008 for this design. No vehicle has yet been constructed as a result of the technological research student project.

See also
 Ballbot

External links
 Tilmann Schlootz personal website
 Audi Snook mentioned with Red Dot Design Award
 Design of the Audi Snook at carbodydesign
 Audi Snook at youtube
 Audi Snook mentioned with IF Concept Award (German)
 Car Design News 5 February 2008

Snook